William J. Walsh (born September 25, 1957) is a retired New York City firefighter, known for his role in the television series Third Watch.  In Third Watch, he started as a firefighter in seasons 1–4, Then in seasons 5–6, Walsh was promoted to the rank Lieutenant of Squad 55. Bill Walsh is a retired Captain of FDNY Squad 41 in the South Bronx.

He also made an appearance as the firefighter who helped Elmo in Sesame Street's Elmo Visits the Firehouse.

References

External links

1957 births
Living people
New York City firefighters
American male film actors
American male television actors
Male actors from New York City
People from the Bronx